Jørgen Mathisen (born 27 December 1984 in Oslo, Norway) is a Norwegian jazz musician (saxophone and clarinet), the younger brother of Martin Mathisen (b. 1978), and known from different bands, and a series of recordings with musician like Marc Lohr, Per Zanussi, Steinar Raknes, Eirik Hegdal, Gard Nilssen, and Kjetil Møster.

Career 
Mathisen is a graduate of the Jazz program at Trondheim Musikkonservatorium (2004–08). He is distinguished by his powerful, expressive play and is a force for all the bands he is involved with. He was first noted in the band Shagma in 2004, and also play within The Core together with Steinar Raknes, Espen Aalberg and Erlend Slettevoll, and within Zanussi Five including Eirik Hegdal, Kjetil Møster and Gard Nilssen, among others. with Tom Hasslan and Axel Skalstad he performed as Krokofant.

Discography 
With Shagma
2005: Music (Jazzaway)

With The Core
2008: Golonka Love (Moserobie Music)
2009: The art of no return (Moserobie Music)
2010: Party (Moserobie Music)

With Zanussi Five
2010: Ghost Dance (Moserobie Music)

With Trondheim Jazz Orchestra
2009: What If? A Counterfactual Fairytale (MNJ Records), conducted and composed by Erlend Skomsvoll
2011: Morning Songs (MNJ Records), composed by Per Zanussi

With Kullhammar, Mathisen, Zetterberg, Aalberg
2014: Basement Sessions Vol. 3 - The Ljublana Tapes (Clean Feed)

With other projects
2007: What you Hear Is What You Get (Ponca Jazz Records), within "Entusijazzme»
2008: Night Creatures (Pling Music), within "Audun Automat»
2010: Stick No Bill (Unit Records), with Marc Lohr and GERÄT7

References

Norwegian jazz saxophonists
Norwegian jazz clarinetists
Norwegian jazz composers
Male jazz composers
Norwegian University of Science and Technology alumni
Musicians from Oslo
1984 births
Living people
21st-century saxophonists
21st-century clarinetists
21st-century Norwegian male musicians
Trondheim Jazz Orchestra members
The Core (band) members